Kalle Klandorf (born on 7 January 1956 in Tallinn) is an Estonian politician, basketball coach and sport figure.

Since 1995 he has coached the teams who play in Meistriliiga. 2012-2016 he was the principal coach of Tallinna Kalev.

1993-1995 he was the president of Estonian Dance Sport Association. Since 2014 he is the president of Estonian Boxing Association.

2005-2011 he was the elder of Lasnamäe District. 2011–2021 he was vice-mayor of Tallinn.

In 2006 he was awarded with Order of the Cross of the Eagle, IV class.

References

Living people
1956 births
Estonian Centre Party politicians
Estonian basketball coaches
Tallinn University alumni
Politicians from Tallinn
Basketball players from Tallinn